Geravand (also Romanized as Gerāvand, Garāvand, and Garāwand; also known as Gerāvand-e Khāleşeh) is a village in Baladarband Rural District, in the Central District of Kermanshah County, Kermanshah Province, Iran. At the 2006 census, its population was 364, in 94 families.

References 

Populated places in Kermanshah County